Köse Halil Pasha ("Beardless Halil Pasha" in Turkish; died 1715), also known as Khalil Pasha al-Kawsaj ("Thin-bearded Halil Pasha" in Arabic), was an Ottoman statesman who served several high-level roles in the Ottoman Empire's administration, including serving as Defterdar (financial minister; 1692/93–1694/95 and 1695/96–1699) and the Ottoman governor of Bosnia Eyalet (1699–1702), Erzurum Eyalet (1703–04), Van Eyalet (1704–06), Basra Eyalet (1706–07, and again 1707–08), Sidon Eyalet (1708–1710), and Egypt Eyalet (1710–11). During his tenure in Erzurum, Hahil Pasha was in command of a military expedition in Georgia in 1703.

As the governor of Egypt, he served during a turbulent time and was overthrown by the local (Mamluk) beys in 1711 after a small civil war.

See also
 List of Ottoman governors of Egypt
 List of Ottoman governors of Bosnia

References

17th-century births
1715 deaths
17th-century people from the Ottoman Empire
18th-century Ottoman governors of Egypt
Ottoman governors of Egypt
Defterdar
Ottoman governors of Bosnia